The  Special Marriage Act, 1954 is an Act of the Parliament of India with provision for civil marriage (or "registered marriage") for people of India and all Indian nationals in foreign countries, irrelevant of the religion or faith followed by either party. The Act originated from a piece of legislation proposed during the late 19th century. Marriages solemnized under Special Marriage Act are not governed by personal laws.

Background 
Henry Sumner Maine first introduced Act III of 1872, which would permit any dissenters to marry whomever they chose under a new civil marriage law.  In the final wording, the law sought to legitimize marriages for those willing to renounce their profession of faith altogether ("I do not profess the Hindu, Christian, Jewish, etc. religion"). It can apply in inter-caste and inter-religion marriages. The Bill faced opposition from local governments and administrators, who believed that it would encourage marriages based on lust, which would inevitably lead to immorality.

The Special Marriage Act, 1954 replaced the old Act III, 1872. The new enactment had three major objectives:
 To provide a special form of marriage in certain cases,
 to provide for registration of certain marriages and,
 to provide for divorce.

Applicability
 Any person, irrespective of religion.
 Hindus, Muslims, Buddhists, Sikhs, Christians, Parsis, or Jews can also perform marriage under the Special Marriage Act, 1954.
 Inter-religion marriages are performed under this Act.
 This Act is applicable to the entire territory of India and extends to intending spouses who are both Indian nationals living abroad.
 Indian national living abroad.

Requirements
 The marriage performed under the Special Marriage Act, 1954 is a civil contract and accordingly, there need be no rites or ceremonial requirements.
 The parties have to file a Notice of Intended Marriage in the specified form to the Marriage Registrar of the district in which at least one of the parties to the marriage has resided for a period of not less than thirty days immediately preceding the date on which such notice is given.
 After the expiration of thirty days from the date on which notice of an intended marriage has been published, the marriage may be solemnised, unless it has been objected to by any person.
 The marriage may be solemnised at the specified Marriage Office.
 Marriage is not binding on the parties unless each party states "I, (A), take thee (B), to be my lawful wife (or husband)," in the presence of the Marriage Officer and three witnesses.

Conditions for marriage
 Each party involved should have no other subsisting valid marriage.  In other words, the resulting marriage should be monogamous for both parties.
 The groom must be at least 21 years old; the bride must be at least 18 years old.
 The parties should be competent in regard to their mental capacity to the extent that they are able to give valid consent for the marriage.
 The parties should not fall within the degree of prohibited relationship.

Court Marriage is a union of two soul where oath ceremony is performed according to Special Marriage Act-1954 before the Registrar of Marriage in the presence of three witnesses thereafter a court marriage certificate is issued directly by the Registrar of Marriage appointed by the Govt. of India.

Succession to the property
Succession to the property of person married under this Act or customary marriage registered under this Act and that of their children, are governed by Indian Succession Act. However, if the parties to the marriage are Hindu, Buddhist, Sikh or Jain religion, the succession to their property will be governed by Hindu succession Act.

The Supreme Court of India, in 2006, made it required to enroll all relational unions. In India, a marriage can either be enlisted under the Hindu Marriage Act, 1955 or under the Special Marriage Act, 1954. The Hindu Marriage Act is pertinent to Hindus, though the Special Marriage Act is appropriate to all residents of India regardless of their religion applicable at  Court marriage.

Judicial Review

Supriyo v. Union of India 
The petition requested the Court to recognise the marriage between any two persons, regardless of gender identity and sexual orientation, and declare the notice and objection provisions as void, by enforcing the fundamental rights guaranteed under Articles 14, 15, 19 and 21 of the Indian Constitution.

Nikesh P.P. & Sonu M.S filed a petition with Kerala High Court on 24th January 2020. Dr Kavita Arora & Ankita Khanna filed a petition with Delhi High Court on 8th October 2020 and they were joined by other petitioners over the course of time. On 6th January 2023, their petitions were transferred to Supreme Court to be heard along with Supriyo v. Union of India (2023). Subsequently, they were joined by Utkarsh Saxena and Ananya Kotia on 15th February 2023 and Akkai Padmashali, Vyjayanti Vasanta Mogli and Umesh P on 20th February 2023. In addition to requesting the recognition of same-sex marriage, these petitioners— Akkai Padmashali, Ananya Kotia, Umesh P, Utkarsh Saxena, and Vyjayanti Vasanta Mogli— challenged the notice and objection provisions of Special Marriage Act of 1954 and Foreign Marriage Act of 1969 which hurt vulnerable minorities.

See also
 Dowry law in India

References

Acts of the Parliament of India 1954
Nehru administration
Marriage law in India
Law of India